Alexandre Boucaut (born 10 August 1980) is a Belgian football referee. He made his debut in the Belgian Pro League at 8 February 2009 in a game between KVC Westerlo and KSC Lokeren. As profession, he's head of a bank in Ath.

References

External links 
 
 
 
 

Belgian football referees
1980 births
Living people
Place of birth missing (living people)
UEFA Champions League referees
UEFA Europa League referees